Turznice  is a village in the administrative district of Gmina Grudziądz, within Grudziądz County, Kuyavian-Pomeranian Voivodeship, in north-central Poland.

References

Turznice